Pinkerton may refer to:

Places
Pinkerton, Ontario, named after surveyor and early settler Matthew Pinkerton
 Pinkerton's Landing Bridge,  railroad bridge in Pennsylvania

People
 Allan Pinkerton (18191884), Scottish detective and spy
 Bill Pinkerton, Scottish footballer
 Brian Pinkerton (active from 2004), American fiction author
 David Pinkerton (18361906), New Zealand politician
 Godfrey Pinkerton (18581937), British architect
 Henry Pinkerton (191586), Scottish footballer
 James Pinkerton (born 1958), American columnist, author, and political analyst
 Jamie Lowther-Pinkerton (born 1960), British private secretary in the Royal Household
 Jay Pinkerton (born 1977), Canadian humorist
 John Pinkerton (17581826), Scottish pseudo-historian
 John Pinkerton (politician) (18451908), Irish politician and Member of Parliament
 John Pinkerton (computer designer) (191997), British computer designer
 Louis Pinkerton (active from 2007), American politician (North Dakota)
 Mike Pinkerton (active from 1997), American software engineer
 Nancy Pinkerton (19402010), American actress
 Percy Edward Pinkerton (18551946), English translator and poet
 Robert Pinkerton (17801859), Scottish missionary, linguist, translator and author
 William Pinkerton (18101893), early South Australian settler

Arts, entertainment, and media

Fictional characters
 Pinkalicious Pinkerton
 Pinky Pinkerton, fictional character in Marvel Comics
 Lieutenant Pinkerton, character in Puccini's opera Madama Butterfly

Films

 Little Miss Pinkerton, Our Gang short comedy film of 1943
 Nat Pinkerton in the Fight (German: Nat Pinkerton im Kampf), 1920 German film

Music
 Pinkerton (album), a 1996 album by Weezer
 Pinkerton Thugs, punk band from Kennebunk, Maine
 Pinkerton's Assorted Colours, mid-1960s pop band from England

Other uses in arts, entertainment, and media

 The Pinkerton Labor Spy, 1907 book which exposed intrigue and abuses by the Pinkerton Detective Agency
 The Pinkertons, an American Western action-adventure detective television series

Law and order
Pinkerton (detective agency), founded in 1850 by Allan Pinkerton
pinkerton - common name, initially agent of Pinkerton National Detective Agency, then synonym for detective
 Anti-Pinkerton Act, a U.S. law of 1893
 Pinkerton v. United States, 328 U.S. 640 (1946), a U.S. Supreme Court case
 Pinkerton liability, a basis of conspiracy liability derived from Pinkerton v. United States

Other uses
 Pinkerton Academy, a high school in Derry, New Hampshire
 Pinkerton Lecture, an annual lecture named after computer designer John Pinkerton